Rarezas (Spanish: Rarities) is the first compilation album released by Héroes del Silencio on July 28, 1998. This was the band's first release since their disbandment in 1996. The album is a compilation of unreleased music, remixes, a cover, rare versions of released songs, and two live performances. The album was released on the label EMI and the songs were selected by drummer Pedro Andreu and bass player Joaquin Cardiel. These songs would be re-released for future compilation albums and the special edition of every studio album.

Track listing

Charts and certifications
 Peak chart positions: 3
 Certification: SPA:Gold

References

External links
 Album on Discogs

1998 compilation albums
Héroes del Silencio albums
Spanish-language albums